ETM2 may refer to:
 ETM2 (gene)
 Eocene Thermal Maximum 2